Tijuana Flats Tex-Mex is a privately-held American restaurant chain serving Tex-Mex cuisine. It has over 135 locations (117 company owned & 18 franchised) throughout Florida, Georgia, North Carolina, Virginia, and Indiana. Tijuana Flats restaurants are fast-casual hybrids with fresh food, hot sauce bars, art murals and off-beat culture. Customers order at the front counter and are served after taking a seat.

The company had 18 locations before expanding out-of-state in 2004.

History
Tijuana Flats was started in Winter Park, Florida. It was modeled after Burrito Brothers, a Mexican restaurant in Gainesville, Florida and funded with $20,000 in borrowed money from Wheeler's family. Students from Wheeler's former college made up some of the restaurant's early customers.

After the third location was opened, a semi-retired restaurant executive, Camp Fitch, was invited to Tijuana Flats by his golf partner. In 1999, Fitch invested in the company and was appointed its CEO to expand the company. When the fourth location opened, the founder's dad, Chester Wheeler, was reimbursed for his $20,000 loan used to start the company and joined as the CFO.

Tijuana Flats had six locations by 2001, which grew to 18 locations in 2004 and 65 by 2009. In 2005, Tijuana Flats built its training center for restaurant managers in Winter Park. Today, the restaurant support and training center is located at the Tijuana Flats HQ in Maitland, FL In 2007, Tijuana Flats shifted from a franchise model to corporate-owned stores. That same year Tijuana Flats created its non-profit arm, the Just in Queso Foundation. The Foundation donated $46,000 to remodel the home of a handicapped war vet and started donating profits from the Just in Queso hot sauce to the Breast Cancer Research Foundation.

In late 2015 the company was sold to AUA Private Equity firm. Brian Wright was named CEO of the company in 2019. In 2021 the company announced that it would be bringing back its franchising program, which was previously suspended in 2007. In October 2022, Joseph D. Christina was named as the companies new CEO.

Restaurant design 
Tijuana Flats is widely known for the unique appearance of their restaurants. The main feature of each location is its hand-painted wall mural. The first mural was painted in 1995 by artist Christopher Galipeau at the original location in Winter Park, Florida. Christopher painted 8 murals for the company before he died of cancer in 2008. His artwork features a series of characters, most notably a gigantic Green "God." This character was featured in many of his murals. After his death, multiple artists tried to replicate his style of work at newer Tijuana Flats locations. 

The company is also known for having a "wall of fame" in each location. Up until 2016, every restaurant featured a wall covered with photos and autographs of celebrities who have visited the establishment. All restaurants built after 2016 no longer feature the iconic wall.

Design changes 
The chain has gone through quite a few different design changes over the years. The original legacy design lasted from 1995 until 2005. These locations looked as if they were all small, local, taco shops. Design elements included celebrity photos scattered across the walls, shelves filled with hot sauces, colorful string lights, and 3D "Hot Bar" signs. In 2008 the company decided it wanted to go for a more "mature" look. Newer restaurants featured wall graffiti, purple & red paint, and darker lights. The celebrity wall of fame was no longer scattered, but rather the photos were neatly lined across the walls in rows. The most notable change came during the "Amped Up" look in 2016. The celebrity "wall of fame" was removed, and the murals were painted on either wood or concrete walls. The restaurants took on a more industrial look. The location in Cary, North Carolina, was updated in 2016 to reflect the "amped up" look. 

In 2020 the company announced the "High-Tech Prototype" design. The first location to open with it was in Noblesville, Indiana. The new design features bright lighting, custom vinyl-printed tables, digital menu boards, decal/graphic covered walls, and a local inspired mural. This design took a drastic turn away from the previous industrial look, as all of the restaurants are covered with bright blue and yellow paint. Gone are the sci-fi wall murals, the new murals depict comical lizards in a local setting. Examples include lizards paddling down the Wekiva River at the Hunt Club location, a lizard fishing at the Ocoee location, and lizards hanging out in a park at the Winter Park location. The murals were moved from the dining room side of the restaurant to the queue side of the restaurant.

Remodeling 
In 2021 the company began remodeling its locations to match the new "High-Tech Prototype" store design. The first location to be remodeled was Tijuana Flats #4, located on Aloma Ave in Winter Park, Florida. The location previously featured the legacy look and later the "mature" store design. The remodel included a new mural, featuring lizards playing in a park. The mural sparked outcry by Tijuana Flats fans on Facebook, as it looked too tame and childish. The company modified the mural to better fit the Tijuana Flats theme. This marked the first location to feature 3 different murals over the years. In 2022 Tijuana Flats #2 in Hunt Club, Florida, was remodeled. The remodel involved removing the 2nd ever Tijuana Flats wall mural, which was painted by artist Christopher Galipeau in the mid 90's. The mural was not only the second painting created for the company, but it was also the first full-wall mural.

Menu 

Tijuana Flats’ entrées include burritos, burrito bowls, chimichangas, dos tacos, flautas, fresh salads, nachos, quesadillas, and wings. Guests have their choice of tortilla with flour and wheat as well as hard corn with tacos. All items except for the flat outrageous items come with their choice of toppings of lettuce, tomatoes, onions, sour cream, and jalapeños as well as fillings including classic shredded and blackened chicken, beef, steak, shrimp, refried and black beans. There are also the options to make the entrées Powerlite with low-fat cheese and sour cream; smothered with queso or chipotle sauce; megajuana with double meat and cheese; and a meal with rice, beans, and drink.

Guests may also order a starter of chips with fresh or spicy salsa, queso, guacamole, or a trio of all three; a side of fresh or spicy salsa, pico de gallo, queso, guac, rice, or beans; and a dessert of churro bites or cookie dough flautas. Burrito, taco, and wing meal kits are also available.

See also
 List of Tex-Mex restaurants

References

External links
 Tijuana Flats official website

Economy of the Southeastern United States
Regional restaurant chains in the United States
Restaurants established in 1995
Fast-food Mexican restaurants
Fast casual restaurants
Mexican restaurants in the United States
Tex-Mex restaurants
1995 establishments in Florida